This is a list of colonial governors of British Somaliland from 1884 to 1960. They administered the territory on behalf of the United Kingdom.

List
Complete list of colonial governors of British Somaliland:

For continuation after independence, see: List of presidents of Somaliland

Notes

Flags

See also
Somaliland
Politics of Somaliland
List of colonial governors of Italian Somaliland
President of Somaliland
List of presidents of Somaliland
List of prime ministers of Somalia
Lists of office-holders

References

Bibliography

Somaliland
Governors of British Somaliland
British Somaliland, Colonial heads
Somalia–United Kingdom relations